Los Guerrilleros may refer to:

 Los Guerrilleros (1963 film), a 1963 Spanish film
 Los guerrilleros (1965 film), a 1965 Argentine film